Alon Segev Gallery (Hebrew: גלריה אלון שגב) is a contemporary art gallery based in Tel Aviv, Israel representing both Israeli and International artists.

Alon Segev Gallery was established in 2000.
Alon Segev Gallery has represented leading contemporary artists including:  Sigalit Landau, Yigal Tumarkin, Gideon Rubin, Chloe Piene, Arik Levy, Tal Mazliah and more.

References 

Articles

Reviews

External links 
 Alon Segev Gallery Homepage

Contemporary art galleries in Israel
Tourist attractions in Tel Aviv